KRDX is an oldies radio station that serves Tucson, Arizona. KRDX broadcasts on the frequency of 103.7 MHz and is licensed to broadcast from Corona de Tucson, Arizona.

Due to the station's ERP of 910 watts and first adjacent channel to Hot 98.3 (KOHT), interference problems can be heard in the northwestern parts of Tucson as well as sporadically through Tucson.

History
KAYN began operating in 1977 as the first FM radio station in Nogales, Arizona. It was owned by Norman and Eva Graham and broadcast with 215 watts ERP on 98.3 MHz. The construction permit was granted over the objections of KFBR, the only other American radio station serving the area. The station was sold to Roadrunner Broadcasting in 1988; KZLZ Broadcasting bought the station, by then known as KLCR, in 1994. In 1999, after two additional sales, Ted Tucker bought the then-KZNO.

In April 2002, Tucker was approved to move KZNO from 98.3 in Nogales to 98.5 in Vail, Arizona, increasing its ERP to 3.9 kW.

According to a U.S. Federal Communications Commission (FCC) filing in 2006, the station had been unable to maintain a reliable power supply, as the only access to the transmitter site was via helicopter, and the station was powered solely by solar panels and wind turbines. The filing with the FCC to operate at less than licensed power or erratically based on power availability was accepted by the FCC, but not approved.

In June 2010, KRDX was granted an FCC construction permit to change the city of license to Corona de Tucson, Arizona and move to 103.7, which should end its long-time interference with KOHT. This station is now available on 103.7, although 98.5 remains available as well. 103.7 now has a much more consistent signal throughout all of Tucson. Neither 98.5 nor 103.7 work at night, as the signal fades into static at about 5:30 p.m. each night. The station was licensed for the new frequency and community of license effective October 9, 2020.

See also
 List of radio stations in Arizona

References

External links

RDX
Radio stations established in 1976
1976 establishments in Arizona
Oldies radio stations in the United States